Peter Dyer may refer to:

Peter Dyer, fictional character in Angus, Thongs and Perfect Snogging
Peter the Dyer, Patriarch of Antioch
Peter Swinnerton-Dyer (1927–2018), English mathematician
Peter Dyer, musician on What Were You Hoping For?